Spalding is a northeastern suburb of Geraldton, Western Australia. Its local government area is the City of Greater Geraldton.

The suburb was gazetted in 1979.

Geography
The Chapman River flows through the suburb.

Demographics

Facilities
Eadon Clarke Sports Centre and the Spalding Park Golf Course are within the suburb.

References

Suburbs of Geraldton